The Hamilton Tigers were a National Hockey League team from based in Hamilton, Ontario.

Hamilton Tigers may also refer to:

Baseball
 Hamilton Tigers (1918), a former baseball team which played part of one season in the International League in 1918
 Hamilton Tigers (Michigan-Ontario League), a former baseball team which played several seasons in the Michigan-Ontario League from 1919-1923

Gridiron football
 Hamilton Tigers (football), a former Canadian football team
 Hamilton Tiger-Cats, a current CFL team formed from merger of Hamilton Tigers football team and Hamilton Wild Cats football team.

Ice hockey
 Hamilton Tigers (CPHL), a former minor league team formed after the dissolution of NHL team
 Hamilton Tigers (OHA), a former amateur senior team which played in the Ontario Hockey Association